Lester Cook (born April 24, 1984)  is an American former professional tennis player.

As a junior, he was top 5 in the country in the 18 and under division, finishing 4th place at the prestigious Kalamazoo Hard Court Nationals and 3rd in the International Grass Court and International Hard Court championships that same year. At 16, he competed in the French Open, U.S. Open, Australian Open, and the Orange Bowl, proudly earning 6 National Sportsmanship awards along the way.

A year later Lester entered college at 17 where he pursued a degree in Economics at Texas A&M University in College Station, TX. In his 3 years at Texas A&M under the tutelage of Tim Cass, Lester was a 3 time All-American finishing with a career high ITA ranking of No. 6 in singles and No. 1 in doubles with partner Ante Matijevic. After his junior year Lester was one of six players asked to represent the U.S. Collegiate All-star Team in a scrimmage match against the Chinese National team.

In 2005, Lester left college and turned pro. In his 6 years on tour, Lester had the privilege of traveling to over 30 countries and 31 states following his dream of being the best tennis player in the world. Along the way he won 8 professional singles titles as well as 18 professional doubles titles reaching a career high ranking of No. 191 in singles and No. 175 in doubles. He competed in all 4 grand slams as a professional and also participated in 3 World Team Tennis seasons being drafted by the Delaware Smash and Newport Beach Breakers twice.

He won the men's singles in the Ojai Tennis Tournament in 2007, 2009, and 2010.

At the end of 2011, Lester retired from the tour and was focused on building a career as a coach. In 2014 he married his girlfriend of five years, Katie. They have two children and live in Ojai, CA. Lester currently works in real estate in both Los Angeles and Ventura County.

Coaching career
- Teaching pro at Malibu Racquet Club starting September 2013

- USTA high performance coach for Jr Davis Cup Team Feb 2014

- Hitting Partner for Sloane Stephens July–December 2014

After retiring from professional tennis, Cook because a real estates agent in Ojai, starting his own (self-named) agency.

ATP Challenger and ITF Futures finals

Singles: 10 (7–3)

Doubles: 19 (13–6)

Performance timeline

Singles

References

External links
 
 
 

1984 births
Living people
People from Calabasas, California
American male tennis players
Tennis people from California
Texas A&M Aggies men's tennis players